NGC 5694 (also known as Caldwell 66) is a globular cluster in the constellation Hydra.  It was discovered in 1784 by William Herschel.

Characteristics

Its chemical composition is highly peculiar, being highly (to nearly solar levels) enriched in alpha elements, suggesting an extragalactic origin before being captured by the Milky Way.

See also
NGC 4372

References

External links
 
 

Globular clusters
Hydra (constellation)
5694
066b
Astronomical objects discovered in 1783